This list of municipalities in the Province of Pomerania is based on the information found in Amtliches Gemeindeverzeichnis für das Deutsche Reich auf Grund der Volkszählung 1939 and Ortsnamenverzeichnis der Ortschaften jenseits von Oder und Neiße

References

Pomerania-related lists